Russell Kenneth Holmes (born July 1, 1982) is an American former professional volleyball player. He was part of the US national team, and a participant at the Olympic Games London 2012. The 2014 World League and the 2015 World Cup winner.

Personal life
Holmes was born in Anaheim, California, United States. His parents are Mark and Tamara Holmes. He has an older sister Leah and a younger brother Dane. 

After graduating from Fountain Valley High School in 2001, he served a mission for the Church of Jesus Christ of Latter-day Saints in London, England. He graduated from Brigham Young University in 2008 with a degree in sociology.

He is married to Krystal, and has two daughters and son – Sadie Rae (born in June 2007 – from his first marriage), Shea Golden (born on April 27, 2015) and Liam Russell (born on August 10, 2017).

Career

Clubs
In 2008–2010, he played overseas for Austria's Hypo Tirol Innsbruck in the Middle European Volleyball Zone Association (MEVZA), winning the MEVZA Cup in 2009 and the Austrian Cup in 2009 and 2010.

During the winter of 2010–2011, Russell played for Minas Tênis Clube in Brazilian Volleyball League. During 2011–13, he played for Poland’s Jastrzębski Węgiel in the PlusLiga and then for Turkey's İstanbul BBSK during the 2013–2014 season in the Turkish Volleyball League. While playing in Istanbul, BBSK reached the Final Four of the CEV Challenge Cup.

In 2014 he returned to PlusLiga, this time playing for Asseco Resovia Rzeszów. In April 2015 he achieved title of Polish Champion with club from Rzeszów.

National team
Holmes made his Olympic debut with the U.S. national team at Olympic Games 2012 in London, Great Britain.

Honours

Clubs
 CEV Champions League
  2014/2015 – with Asseco Resovia

 FIVB Club World Championship
  Doha 2011 – with Jastrzębski Węgiel

 National championships
 2008/2009  Austrian Cup, with Hypo Tirol Innsbruck
 2008/2009  Austrian Championship, with Hypo Tirol Innsbruck
 2009/2010  Austrian Cup, with Hypo Tirol Innsbruck
 2009/2010  Austrian Championship, with Hypo Tirol Innsbruck
 2014/2015  Polish Championship, with Asseco Resovia

Individual awards
 2011: FIVB Club World Championship – Best Middle Blocker
 2016: CEV Champions League – Best Middle Blocker

References

External links

 Player profile at TeamUSA.org 
 
 Player profile at PlusLiga.pl 
 
 
 Player profile at Volleybox.net

1982 births
Living people
Sportspeople from Anaheim, California
American Mormon missionaries in England
Latter Day Saints from California
American men's volleyball players
Olympic volleyball players of the United States
Volleyball players at the 2012 Summer Olympics
American expatriate sportspeople in Austria
Expatriate volleyball players in Austria
American expatriate sportspeople in Brazil
Expatriate volleyball players in Brazil
American expatriate sportspeople in Poland
Expatriate volleyball players in Poland
American expatriate sportspeople in Turkey
Expatriate volleyball players in Turkey
American expatriate sportspeople in France
Expatriate volleyball players in France
BYU Cougars men's volleyball players
Jastrzębski Węgiel players
Resovia (volleyball) players
Middle blockers